Alysa Liu (born August 8, 2005) is a retired American competitive figure skater. Liu is the youngest-ever U.S. women's national champion, having won her first title at age 13. She is also the youngest to win two senior national titles at age 14. Liu is the first to win two consecutive titles since Ashley Wagner in 2012 and 2013. She is also the first woman to win the junior and senior titles back-to-back since Mirai Nagasu in 2008. She is the 2022 World bronze medalist, the 2021 CS Nebelhorn Trophy champion, the 2021 CS Lombardia Trophy champion, and a two-time U.S. national champion (2019, 2020). She competed in the 2022 Winter Olympics, placing seventh.

On the junior level, Liu is the 2020 World Junior bronze medalist, the 2019–20 Junior Grand Prix Final silver medalist, a two-time Junior Grand Prix champion, and the 2018 U.S. junior national champion. An accomplished jumper, she was the first junior American women's singles skater to successfully complete a triple Axel in international competition, the first American woman to land a quadruple jump, and the first woman to complete both a quad and triple Axel in the same program.

Personal life 
Liu was born on August 8, 2005, in Clovis, California, the oldest child of Arthur Liu, an attorney who immigrated to the U.S. from a small mountain village in Sichuan, China, in the 1990s at the age of 25, after earning degrees in China. He was further educated in California, earning  M.B.A. and J.D. degrees. Liu is the oldest of five children; like her siblings (a sister, Selina, and triplets Joshua, Justin, and Julia), she was conceived through an anonymous egg donor and a surrogate mother. At the time of Liu's birth, her father was still married to Yan "Mary" Qingxin, whom Liu and her siblings refer to as their mom and who acts as their legal guardian, even after her divorce from Arthur. Liu and her father once stated that her younger sister, Selina, used to skate, but quit after she lost her first competition.

Liu attended Chinese school for three years, then attended the Oakland School for the Arts, which, at the time, offered an emphasis in figure skating. When she started missing too much school due to traveling to competitions, she began homeschooling at her father's law office in between practices. She uses the same online program that other skaters, including fellow Bay Area skaters Karen Chen and Vincent Zhou, have used. Liu graduated high school in June 2021 at age 16. Liu also limited her social media use after an abundance of very negative comments on her posts, causing her to find it “not worth it” and "exhausting."  

In 2019, Liu was named to the inaugural Time 100 Next list. Michelle Kwan authored the recognition article. Liu has previously cited Alina Zagitova, Alena Kostornaia, and Anna Shcherbakova as inspirations to her and has been seen supporting Zagitova at the 2019-20 Junior Grand Prix Final in Turin with former coach, Laura Lipetsky, by Liu's side in the stands. Liu was also seen gushing over Kostornaia and Shcherbakova in interviews around the same timeframe.

On January 7, 2022, Liu stated, via an Instagram story, that she had contracted Covid-19 and had withdrawn from the free skate later that day at the 2022 U.S. Championships; however, Liu sent her support to the other skaters and said that she would be petitioning for her spot on the Beijing 2022 Olympic team along with pairs team Alexa Knierim and Brandon Frazier, who also had to withdraw from the event due to Covid.

Liu was considered the frontrunner female recruitment prospect for China as a part of its "naturalization project" to recruit overseas athletes in the Beijing 2022 Winter Olympics. Her father, however, would not be persuaded. In March 2022, it was reported that Liu and her father (who had left China as a political refugee following his participation in the Tiananmen Square pro-democracy protests in 1989) had been targeted in November 2021 by spies allegedly under direction of the Chinese government, in an operation to collect private information on Chinese political dissidents living in the United States. One spy posed as a U.S. Olympic Committee official and requested copies of their passports. Her father stated that the scheme was likely designed to "intimidate" him and to "silence" him from "say[ing] anything political or related to human rights violations in China"; he added that he was concerned for his daughter's safety while she was in Beijing but he agreed to let her compete after receiving assurances that the U.S. State Department would take additional precautions to protect her.

Liu uses both she/her and they/them personal pronouns according to her Instagram and official U.S. Figure Skating profiles.

Career

Early career
Liu began skating at age five when her father, a fan of Michelle Kwan, brought her to the Oakland Ice Center. She began taking group lessons with her first and childhood coach, Laura Lipetsky, a former figure skater who had trained under Frank Carroll, and quickly moved to individual sessions. Laura Lipetsky began teaching Liu at the age of 5½ years old, and Liu's first choreographer, Cindy Stuart, also started working with Liu when she was young.

As a juvenile in 2015, Liu came in seventh place at the Central Pacific Regionals. At the 2016 U.S. Championships, she became the youngest female skater to earn the intermediate gold medal, winning by less than a point. She was first after the short program; her free skate included two triple Salchows, the first completed in combination with a double toe loop and earning her a "program-high 7.00 points".

Competing in the novice category, Liu placed fourth at the 2017 U.S. Championships. She was in first place after her short program with a 1.22 point lead. Her short program included a split jump into a triple Lutz-triple toe loop combination, which was ruled under-rotated, and a triple flip. Liu fell to fourth place after the long program in which she landed two triple-triple combinations but did not earn sufficient program component scores to retain her narrow lead.

2017–18 season: National junior champion
Liu opened her season with a silver medal at the 2017 Asian Open Trophy in which she finished second to Japan's Mana Kawabe. She was the youngest skater to compete in the junior division at the 2018 U.S. Championships in San Jose, California. She won the competition despite suffering from a cold and sore throat. She scored a season's best in the short program with an almost seven-point lead going into the free skate. Her short program included three level-4 spins, a triple flip-triple toe loop combination, and a triple Lutz, earning her 63.83 points. She earned 120.33 points during her long program after landing two double Axels and seven triple jumps, which were all backloaded in the second half of the program. Liu was given extra points on all her jumps except for the triple flip-single loop-triple Salchow combination. She earned an overall score of 184.16 points, almost 18 more than silver medalist Pooja Kalyan, and the second highest-ever score on the junior level. Despite winning the gold, Liu was ineligible to compete at the 2018 World Junior Championships because she was not old enough. She was sent to the 2018 International Challenge Cup instead, where she won the advanced novice silver medal behind Hanna Yoshida of Japan.

2018–19 season: First senior national title
In August 2018, Liu competed as a novice at the 2018 Asian Open Trophy in Bangkok, Thailand. She won the gold, outscoring the silver medalist, Japan's Sara Honda, by over ten points. She landed a ratified triple Axel in the free skate, becoming the youngest skater in history to perform a clean triple Axel in competition and the fourth American female skater to do so following Tonya Harding, Kimmie Meisner, and Mirai Nagasu.

Although Liu was too young to compete internationally at the senior or junior level, she qualified to compete in the senior ranks at the 2019 U.S. Championships in Detroit, Michigan. On January 25, 2019, she broke Tara Lipinski's previous record and became the youngest skater to win the U.S. senior women's title after placing second in the short to defending U.S. champion Bradie Tennell with a record score (which was broken minutes later by Tennell) and first in the free skate. She became the youngest female skater to land a triple Axel at the U.S. Nationals, as well as the third female skater to do so (after Harding and Meissner), and the first female skater to do so during a short program at Nationals. She was also the first female skater to complete three triple Axels in U.S. competition. Liu scored 73.89 points in her short program, 2.71 points behind Tennell, the leader after the short program. In the long program, Tennell and Mariah Bell, who took third place in the short program, both made errors, ""opening the door for Liu". Her program component score "fell well short of Tennell's and Bell's", but her technical scores made up the difference, and she posted an overall score of 217.51. She completed two consecutive triple Axels, including the first one in combination, during her long program and, out of the other six triples she completed (one of which was also in combination), only the flip was downgraded.

Since Liu was too young to compete at both the junior and senior level World Championships, her season ended in January, after U.S. Nationals, which gave her time to work on her skating skills and choreography with Italian skater Carolina Kostner in Rome, an arrangement made by her coach, Laura Lipetsky. She also began working with Italian choreographer and Olympic ice dancing competitor Massimo Scali, who is now based in Oakland, on her skating skills and choreography at the end of 2019.

2019–20 season: International junior debut and second senior national title
Liu's first competition for the 2019–2020 season was at the inaugural Aurora Games, an international all-female competition held in August 2019. She earned perfect scores, led the U.S. team to first place overall, and was the first American female skater to successfully complete a quadruple Lutz in competition, although not at an ISU-recognized event.

Liu made her international competition debut at the ISU Junior Grand Prix in Lake Placid in August 2019. Skating to "Don't Rain on My Parade" by Barbra Streisand in her short program, she scored 69.30 points, breaking her own personal best short program record by almost 20 points. She completed all her jumps, including three triples, completed three level-4 spins, and earned positive grades of execution for all seven elements. During her long program, Liu became the first American female skater to complete a quadruple Lutz in a competition. She also became the first female skater to complete a quadruple jump and a triple Axel in the same program in a competition. Skating to pianist Jennifer Thomas’ version of “New World Symphony," which was choreographed by Lori Nichol, Liu started her long program with a triple Axel-double toe loop combination, followed by her quadruple Lutz, which she earned 13.80 points for. She fell on her second triple Axel but successfully executed her following six triple jumps. She also earned level-4 scores for her three spins and top marks for her step sequence, earning a 59.66 program component score. She won the event by 21.52 points over the silver medalist, South Korean Park Yeon-jeong. It was the first in 20 Junior Grand Prix events that a non-Russian skater won and the first time an American won a Junior Grand Prix event since Polina Edmunds in 2013.

Liu's second slot in the Junior Grand Prix was in Poland.  She came in fourth after the short program but came from behind to win the event. In her short program, she completed, at the start of her program, a triple Axel-triple toeloop, the first in Junior Grand Prix history. She doubled a planned triple loop, trailing by a little over four points going into the free skate. In her free skate, Liu "just about held onto" her first jump, a triple Axel, but improved as she went along, completing a combination that included a double toe loop. She then completed a quadruple Lutz, a "much better" triple Axel, a triple loop, and "two excellent combinations—triple Lutz-triple toe loop and triple Lutz-Euler-triple Salchow". She ended her program with a triple flip and earned three level-4 spins. She earned a season's best score of 138.99 in the free skate and 203.10 overall. She qualified for the Junior Grand Prix Final in second place, the first American female skater to do so since Karen Chen and Polina Edmunds in 2013, with 30 points.

Liu won the silver medal at the Junior Grand Prix Final behind Russia's Kamila Valieva and ahead of Daria Usacheva, also of Russia. A little over two points separated the first and fourth-place skaters in the short program. Liu placed first in the short program with a triple Axel-triple toe combination and 71.09 points, a little over a one-point lead. Although her jumps were the most difficult in her long program and she successfully completed six triple jumps, both her quadruple Lutzes and a triple Axel were judged underrotated, and she fell on her opening triple Axel, placing her second in the free skate and second overall. She told reporters afterward, "I think I should have only done one quad, but I really wanted to go for it just for the fun of it".

Liu entered the 2020 U.S. Championships as the favorite to defend her title. She placed second in the short program after turning out of her triple Axel attempt but successfully landed a triple flip and a triple Lutz-triple toe combination, as well as executing level-4 spins and footwork.  She earned 75.40 points, a little over 3.50 points behind Bradie Tennell; she also had a technical base value advantage of more than 16 points over both Tennell and Bell. Skating last and immediately after Mariah Bell's "elegant, near flawless performance" to k.d. lang's version of the Leonard Cohen song "Hallelujah", Liu won the free skate by over eight points, with a score of 160.12, which was her career-best, and 235.52 points overall. Her final score was over 10 points higher than Bell's, who came in second place, and just under 15 points over Tennell's, who came in third. Although she failed to be the first woman at U.S. Nationals to successfully complete a quadruple Lutz, which was called under-rotated and received negative grade of execution scores, her "triple Axels were solid, and her final two spins were of surpassing quality". She landed two triple Axels in the first 65 seconds of her program and then completed six more triple jumps. Liu told reporters afterward, "This year I’m thinking, it’s a new decade, like, wow, what a good start!" At the age of 14, Liu's win made her the youngest two-time women's U.S. champion and the first woman in seven years to win back-to-back U.S. championships, since Ashley Wagner in 2012 and 2013 and since Michelle Kwan won 8 consecutive titles.  Bell and Tennell assisted Liu to the top tier of the podium during the awards ceremony, recreating what they had done the previous year. Liu was age-ineligible to compete in international senior-level competitions but was named to the 2020 World Junior Championships team alongside Starr Andrews and Lindsay Thorngren.

Liu came into her first World Junior Championships ranked third in the world among juniors; ultimately, she placed third, behind Valieva and Usacheva. She came in fourth after her short program; according to ESPN, she did not "skate nearly as well at the past two national championships", and lost points for an under-rotation and negative grade of execution, but she successfully completed a triple Axel-triple toe loop combination jump, earning 67.52 points. In her solid long program, Liu earned the second-highest technical score, with 137.31 points, came in third place in the long program and earned a cumulative score of 204.83 points.  She under-rotated her opening triple Axel and fell on her quadruple Lutz but successfully landed a triple Axel and six more triple jumps and earned level-four spins and footwork.

On June 22, 2020, Liu announced that she was leaving longtime coach Laura Lipetsky and that she had hired coaches Lori Nichol and Massimo Scali, who she started working with in 2019, as well as Lee Barkell. Liu plans to remain based in Oakland, California in the Bay Area, where Scali primarily works, while communicating with Nichol and Barkell via online video conferencing and occasionally traveling to their base in Toronto, Canada.

2020–21 season: Growth spurt and transitional year 
Liu had limited international competition opportunities after the 2020–21 ISU Junior Grand Prix was canceled due to the COVID-19 pandemic, and she was age-ineligible for senior Grand Prix competitions. While struggling with her jumps due to a growth spurt, she placed fourth in the domestic ISP Points Challenge behind Mariah Bell, Bradie Tennell, and Amber Glenn. In October, Liu was invited to the 2020 Las Vegas Invitational, a domestic competition sponsored by U.S. Figure Skating, as part of Team Johnny. She finished sixth individually, and the team finished second behind Team Tara. Liu was unable to compete at full strength during the event after a fall on her triple Axel in practice led to a right hip injury. She was able to recover after forgoing triple jumps for about a month.

On December 11, 2020, Liu announced the addition of former four-time US men's champion Jeremy Abbott to her coaching team.

In January, Liu competed at the 2021 U.S. Championships in Las Vegas.  Her difficulties at earlier competitions raised doubts about how she would perform at the event, particularly as she would not attempt a triple Axel or a quad in the competition.  To the surprise of many, she placed second in the short program with a clean skate. In the free skate, she doubled one jump and underrotated two others, placing fourth in that segment and dropping to fourth overall, winning the pewter medal. Liu said afterward that she has already resumed training one of her more difficult ultra-c elements, the triple Axel, as of December 2020 and will try to resume training the other difficult elements in preparation for the next season.

In an Instagram story on June 19, 2021, Liu posted a combined, side-by-side video of her doing a triple axel and a quad lutz attempt in training in the lead-up to the 2021-22 season.

2021–22 season: International senior debut, Beijing Olympics, World Championships, and retirement

International Senior Debut 
Liu competed in the fourth annual Peggy Fleming Trophy, an event for senior-level US figure skaters where skating elements are evaluated "from an artistic point of view". She came in second with a score of 118.61, behind Karen Chen.

Liu spent the month of June training with Italian coach Lorenzo Magri in Egna, Italy, aiming to improve her jump technique with the help of the ISU technical specialist. She also cited the presence in the camp of elite Italian skaters Matteo Rizzo, Daniel Grassl and Gabriele Frangipani, in contrast with her Oakland training facility that lacked skaters who performed more difficult elements. Magri subsequently was added as a permanent member of her coaching team.

Liu made her senior international debut at the Cranberry Cup, a Senior B competition at the Skating Club of Boston in Norwood, MA on August 14 and 15, 2021. Liu won the competition after coming in first in both the short and the free programs. Liu attempted a triple Axel in the free but fell. Liu won the competition with a total score of 205.74, ahead of You Young of South Korea and US teammate, Mariah Bell.

Making her debut on the ISU Challenger series, Liu won the 2021 CS Lombardia Trophy by over 32 points, successfully landing a triple Axel and receiving new personal bests.

On August 30, 2021, US Figure Skating announced that Liu had been selected to compete at the 2021 CS Nebelhorn Trophy, with the goal of qualifying a secured third berth for American women at the 2022 Winter Olympics. Team USA teammate Karen Chen unofficially earned the third spot at the 2021 World Figure Skating Championships in Stockholm, and Liu was sent to secure that earned spot. Liu placed first in both segments of the competition to take the gold medal and the first of six available Olympic places. She said afterward that she was "kind of mad" to have singled her free skate attempt at a triple Axel, but that "overall I'm happy with how I skated." Liu was the overall women's winner on the 2021-22 ISU Challenger Series, beating Georgia's Anastasia Gubanova by nearly 40 points.

Liu made her senior Grand Prix debut at the 2021 Skate Canada International, where she placed fourth in the short program segment. In the free skate, she fell on an underrotated opening triple Axel attempt and underrotated three other jumps; as a result, she placed seventh in that segment and dropped to fifth place overall. At her second assignment, the 2021 NHK Trophy, she finished in fourth place.

Two days after her fourth-place finish at the 2021 NHK Trophy, she switched her coaching team to Christy Krall, Drew Meekins, and Viktor Pfeifer.

At the 2022 U.S. Championships in Nashville, Liu placed third in the short program, scoring 71.42 points despite falling on her triple Axel attempt. However, she was forced to withdraw from the event after testing positive for COVID-19. Despite this, she successfully petitioned to be included on the 2022 U.S. Winter Olympic team, alongside Mariah Bell and Karen Chen. Liu was the youngest athlete named to the American Olympic team.

2022 Beijing Winter Olympics & World Championships 
In the women's event at the 2022 Winter Olympics, Liu placed eighth in the short program after receiving an edge call on her flip and slightly underrotating the second part of her jump combination. She did not attempt a triple Axel in the segment. Notwithstanding those errors, she said she was happy as "all my training paid off because I'm here competing. And the goal of my whole life and my skating career was to compete at the Olympics." She moved up to seventh place in the free skate despite underrotating her triple Axel attempt. She said she was "still in shock at how well I did. I worked a lot on this, and I'm glad I did two clean programs. I'm making a lot of memories here, and they're all really good ones." Liu was subsequently invited to skate at the exhibition gala but had not prepared an exhibition program as she had not anticipated this. A program to "Loco" by K-pop group Itzy was choreographed for her on-site by American ice dancer Jean-Luc Baker, with a dress borrowed from Spanish ice dancer Olivia Smart.

At the 2022 World Championships Liu was considered a podium contender in the much more open contest. She placed fifth in the short program with a clean skate. In the free skate, Liu attempted a triple Axel, landing it with an under rotation. She also underrotated the second part of a jump combination but landed six clean triple jumps and rose to third place, winning the bronze medal. She became the first American woman to medal at the World Championships since Ashley Wagner in 2016, and only the second since 2006.

Retirement 
On April 9, 2022, Liu announced on Instagram that she was retiring from figure skating, stating that she felt satisfied with her career, had completed her goals, and was "moving on with [her] life". Her early retirement marked her as the first American women’s singles skater to not bid for a second Olympics since 2002 gold medalist Sarah Hughes.

Programs

Records and achievements 
First female skater to land both a quadruple jump and a triple Axel (2019 JGP United States).
 First female skater to land two triple Axels and a quad in the same program (2019 JGP Poland).
 First American female skater to successfully land a quadruple Lutz.
 Youngest ladies U.S. Figure Skating National Champion in 2019.

Competitive highlights 

GP: Grand Prix; JGP: Junior Grand Prix. Pewter medals (4th place) awarded only at U.S. national, sectional, and regional events.

Detailed results

Senior Level

ISU Personal Bests highlighted in bold.

Junior Level

References

Works cited
 Schwindt, Troy (March 2019). "Geico U.S. Figure Skating Championships, Detroit 2019: Senior Ladies". Skating. 96 (3): 12–14. Retrieved 1 September 2019.

External links

 Arthur Liu's YouTube channel

American female single skaters
Living people
2005 births
Sportspeople from Richmond, California
American sportspeople of Chinese descent
American children
21st-century American women
Sportspeople from Clovis, California
World Junior Figure Skating Championships medalists
World Figure Skating Championships medalists
Figure skaters at the 2022 Winter Olympics
Olympic figure skaters of the United States
American sportswomen
American sportswomen of Chinese descent